The Kawarau Gorge Suspension Bridge spans the Kawarau River in the Otago region in the South Island of New Zealand. The bridge is mainly used for commercial purposes by the AJ Hackett Bungy Company for bungy jumping - the world's first commercial bungy jumping site. The bridge carries walkers, runners and bikers on the Queenstown Trail over the river.

Location

The bridge is in a Department of Conservation reserve, between the start of the Crown Range Road and Gibbston in the Kawarau Gorge within the Wakatipu Basin.

History

The bridge was designed by Harry Higginson. The bridge was completed in late 1880 as a key access route to the Central Otago goldfields. Traffic was moved to a new highway bridge on State Highway 6 in 1963.

The suspension bridge is classified by the New Zealand Historic Places Trust as a Category I historic place. Today, it is a tourist attraction with commercialised ziplines and bungee jumping.

Name

The bridge's many names include the Kawarau Gorge Suspension Bridge, Kawarau Suspension Bridge, Kawarau bridge and Kawarau Bungy Bridge.

Gallery

References 

Suspension bridges in New Zealand
Queenstown-Lakes District
Bungee jumping sites
Bridges in Otago
Heritage New Zealand Category 1 historic places in Otago